Senti Aur Mental is an unreleased Pakistani comedy film directed and written by Yasra Rizvi, produced by Emad Binte Syed under the production banner of Harkat Pictures as company's debut. The film featured Zain Afzal, Yasra Rizvi and Yousaf Bashir Qureshi in the lead cast. The film was projected by the director to be completed and released in 2019. The director of photography is Qasim Mansoor. Habib Khan Swati is the co-producer of the movie.

In December 2021, the makers called it quit.

Plot 
Senti Aur Mental is about family drama. It is based on a wedding.

Cast
Zain Afzal as Saad: the Mental
Yasra Rizvi as Paras; the Senti
Faryal Mehmood as Pikku
Irfan Khoosat as father of Senti
Beo Zafar as Niggi; mother of Senti
Jinaan Hussain as Hadia
Arez Ahmed as Groom
Nimra Butcha
Saifee Hassan
Yousaf Bashir Qureshi
Abdullah Altaf
Laila Wasti

References

External links

Urdu-language Pakistani films
Unreleased Pakistani films